Club de Regatas Vasco da Gama, commonly referred as Vasco da Gama or simply Vasco, is a professional sports club based in Rio de Janeiro, Brazil. Originally a rowing club, Vasco is mostly known for its football team, who currently competes in the Brasileirão Série A, the top tier of Brazilian football league and in the Cariocão Série A, the top tier of Rio de Janeiro state football league.

Named Vasco da Gama 400 years after 1498 European-Asian sea route, the club was founded on 21 August 1898 as a rowing club by Brazilian workers and Portuguese immigrant tradesmen, and created its football department on 26 November 1915. Vasco da Gama have played their home matches in São Januário stadium since 1927, and also in Maracanã stadium since 1950. Vasco da Gama is one of the most widely supported teams in Brazil and the Americas. According to census and polls, Vasco is the fifth-most supported club in Brazil, with more than 15 million supporters. Due to its history of diversity and mobilization, the club became a symbol of anti-racism and anti-xenophobia in Brazilian sport.

In national football, Vasco da Gama has won 4 Brasileirão, one Copa do Brasil, 24 Cariocão, and three Torneio Rio–São Paulo. In international club football, the club has won one Copa Libertadores and one South American Championship of Champions. Vasco da Gama holds many long-standings rivalries, most notably the Clássico dos Milhões with Flamengo, a club rivalry original of rowing in 1900s and extended to football in 1920s.

History

Foundation
In the late 19th century, rowing was the most important sport in Rio de Janeiro. At this time, four young men – Henrique Ferreira Monteiro, Luís Antônio Rodrigues, José Alexandre d'Avelar Rodrigues and Manuel Teixeira de Souza Júnior – who did not want to travel to Niterói to row with the boats of Gragoatá Club, decided to found a rowing club.

On August 21, 1898, in a room of the Sons of Talma Dramatic Society, 62 members (mostly Portuguese immigrants) formed the Club de Regatas Vasco da Gama (Vasco da Gama Rowing Club). Inspired by the celebrations of the 4th centenary of the first sail from Europe to India, the founders named the club in honor of Portuguese explorer Vasco da Gama. The emblem was created shortly after. The diagonal slash in the emblem represents the route the Portuguese explorer took, and the cross symbolizes the Christian faith.

On November 26, 1915, Vasco and Lusitania Sport Clube merged, resulting in the creation of Vasco's footballing department. Beginning in the lower leagues, the club's first match was played on May 3, 1916; a 10–1 loss to Paladino FC. Vasco became champion of the Carioca Serie B in 1922 and ascended to Serie A. Vasco won its first top-division title with the 1923 Campeonato Carioca, becoming champion with a team including whites, blacks and "mulatto" players of different social classes.

1920s: Overcoming social & class inequality
During the 1920s, football in Brazil was a sport for the elites, and Vasco da Gama's racially diverse squad didn't appease them. Some players were required to take a literacy exam before putting on their boots. In 1924 Vasco da Gama was pressured by the Metropolitan League to ban some players who were not considered adequate to play in the aristocratic league, notably because they were black or mulato and/or poor. After Vasco refused to comply with such a ban, the other big teams, including Fluminense, Flamengo and Botafogo created the Metropolitan Athletic Association and prohibited Vasco from participating unless it complied with their racist demands.

As a result, The former President of Vasco, José Augusto Prestes, responded with a letter that became known as the Historic Response (Resposta Histórica), which revolutionized the practice of sports in Brazil. After a few years, the racism barriers fell, and Vasco became known as "Clube de todas as raças" (Club of all races). The club had led the move toward a more inclusive football culture, forward-thinking not employed by leaders from other Rio-based clubs like Fluminense, Flamengo and Botafogo.

Even though the club was not the first to field black players, it was the first one to win a league with them, which led to an outcry to ban "blue-collar workers" from playing in the league—a move that in practice meant barring blacks from playing.

In 1925 Vasco was readmitted into the "elite" league, with its black and mulatto players. By 1933, when football became professional in Brazil, most of the big clubs had black players.

On April 21, 1927, Vasco's Stadium was inaugurated with a match against Santos. Santos won the match 5–3. On April 26, 1931, Vasco had a historic 7–0 victory over rivals Flamengo; this is the largest victory margin between the two clubs.

Expresso da Vitória (1944–53) 
Between 1944 and 1953, the club was nicknamed Expresso da Vitória (Victory Express), as Vasco won several competitions in that period, such as the Rio de Janeiro championship in 1945, 1947, 1949, 1950, and 1952, and the South American Club Championship, the world's first ever continental club tournament, in 1948. In 1953, Vasco da Gama won its first intercontinental trophy, the Torneio Intercontinental Octogonal Rivadavia Correa Meyer. Players such as Ademir de Menezes, Moacyr Barbosa, Bellini and Ipojucan starred in Vasco's colors during that period.

The Super-Superchampions Generation (1956–59) 
In 1956, the Vascaínos became Rio de Janeiro champions and Little World Cup runner-up, losing the title to Di Stefano's Real Madrid, which Vasco would beat in a friendly shortly after the end of the tournament, becoming the first non-European club to defeat a European Champion. In 1957, this generation toured Europe and won 10 consecutive matches, including yet another victory against European champion Real Madrid (4–3) on 14 June, which sealed the Paris Tournament title - this match was the first ever, at a competitive level, between two continental champions. It also was the only international tournament Real didn't win between 1955 and 1960. Vasco would also beat Athletic Bilbao (champion of the Spanish League and Cup in the previous year) by winning the traditional Teresa Herrera Trophy with a 4–2 scoreline, and Barcelona (champion of the Spanish Cup a week earlier) inside Les Corts, with a historic scoreline of 2–7, the second worst defeat ever suffered at home by the Catalan team, and largest in international matches. Benfica (Portuguese champion and Latin Cup runner-up) was also a victim of Vasco on this tour, losing to the Brazilian club with another impressive result, 5–2, in Lisbon on 30 June 1957.

In early 1958, just before the World Cup, Vasco won the Rio-São Paulo Tournament, the most important championship in Brazil at the time, which in this edition included teams such as Santos of Pelé, Botafogo of Garrincha, Flamengo of Zagallo and Fluminense of Telê Santana. After this memorable title, three Vasco players had important parts in the campaign for the first Brazil World Cup title: Vavá (who scored five goals in the World Cup, including two in the final) and defenders Orlando and Bellini (the best defending pair of the tournament, Bellini was still the Brazilian captain). After the World Cup, the team then won the greatest Carioca Championship of all time. In an epic competition against Flamengo of Zagallo and Botafogo of Garrincha and Nilton Santos (it needed two extra tiebreaker tournaments to decide the champion), Vasco became the carioca "super-superchampion" of 1958.

In 1959, the team went on to beat great European teams like Italian champion Milan and Atletico de Madrid (European Cup semi-finalist on that year) in the Metropolitano. Vasco was also Rio-São Tournament runner-up this year, only behind Santos of Pelé. Still in 1959, five Vasco players were called up for the 1959 Copa America: Paulinho, Orlando, Bellini, Coronel (defenders) and Almir (striker). Brazil would end the tournament unbeaten (four wins and two draws) with the four aforementioned Vasco players almost always being included in the starting eleven. Despite the good campaign, Argentina would keep the title, after ending the tournament with an extra victory. Vasco, together with Botafogo, was the club that gave the most players to the Brazil national team in that period. Most football lovers think this Vasco was one of the best clubs of the world at the time, and maybe the best in 1957–58.

1970s: First League Title 
In the 1965 Campeonato Brasileiro, Vasco da Gama reached the league's final and were very close to winning its first league title, but lost to Pele's Santos 1–6 on aggregate. In 1970, under star players Roberto Dinamite and Edgardo Andrada, Vasco won the regional title for the first time in 12 years. In 1974, they won their first league title, with Roberto Dinamite as the top scorer. In addition, they became the first team from Rio to win the league. Cruzeiro and Vasco had ended the season with the same number of points, meaning that a second match had to be played; Vasco later beat Cruzeiro 2–1 and wonc the title.

1997–2000: Second Golden era 
After winning the Campeonato Brasileiro in 1997, beating Palmeiras in the final, Vasco started its Projeto Tóquio, and invested US$10 million to win the 1998 Copa Libertadores. Vasco da Gama won the Copa Libertadores in its Centenary Year, beating Barcelona of Ecuador in the finals 4–1 on aggregate, and 50 years after winning its first South American trophy (South American Championship of Champions).

By winning the Copa Libertadores title, Vasco da Gama faced the 1997–98 UEFA Champions League winners Real Madrid at the 1998 Intercontinental Cup, in Tokyo, Japan, losing 2–1.

As a result of their Copa Libertadores title two years prior, Vasco entered the inaugural 2000 FIFA Club World Championship held in Brazil. They beat Manchester United of England, Necaxa of Mexico, and South Melbourne of Australia in the group stage to reach the final. It finished 0–0 after extra time in an all-Brazilian clash with Corinthians, but Vasco lost 3–4 in the penalty shootout.

Also in 2000, Vasco won the Copa Mercosur against Palmeiras in a historic match on December 20, 2000. Typically the finals are played over two legs, but a third match would be needed if a different team won each leg. This ended up being the case; Vasco had won the first leg 2–0, but Palmeiras won the second leg 1–0 six days later. Trailing 3–0 at the end of first-half, with Palmeiras scoring 2 goals in less than a minute, Vasco managed to score 3 goals to level the match at 3–3 with five minutes remaining, while playing with 10 men after Júnior Baiano got a red card in the 77th minute. In the 93rd minute, Romário scored a decisive goal and Vasco won the match 4–3. The match is still considered one of the best games in Brazilian history.

Vasco won the Copa João Havelange in 2000. Seen as a controversial competition organized by Clube dos 13 rather than CBF, Vasco played São Caetano in the finals. The club drew the first game 1–1 at Estádio Palestra Itália, and the second game was called off by Rio de Janeiro State Governor Anthony Garotinho in the first half because a fence collapsed at São Januário Stadium, which resulted in the injuries of many fans. Despite the disaster, Vasco won the rescheduled second leg 3–1 to lift the trophy.

2001–2008: Decline 
After winning the Copa Mercosul in 2000, the club experienced a sharp decline, narrowly avoiding relegation in 2003 and 2004, although in 2005 they qualified for the 2006 Copa Sudamericana with a 12th-placed finish. Vasco's 2006 season was decent, finishing sixth in the league and gaining qualification for the following years Sudamericana, as well as reaching the Copa do Brasil final for the first time, losing to Flamengo.

2008: First ever Relegation 
The team finished the 2008 Série A in a disastrous 18th place and was relegated to the second division for the first time since its foundation after a 0–2 home loss against EC Vitória. Until then, it had been one of only six clubs to have never been relegated from the first division, along with Cruzeiro, Flamengo, Santos and São Paulo. (The last two didn't participate in the 1979 Brazilian Championship, in order to avoid conflicts with Paulista Championship schedule.)

Vasco immediately secured their return to Serie A, sealing promotion to the 2010 Série A on 7 November 2009 with a 2–1 victory over Juventude in front of a Serie B-record 81,000 fans at Maracanã, and finishing as Serie B champions as well.

2010–2012: Copa do Brasil title, Return to Copa Libertadores 
In the 2010 league season, their first season back in the top flight since relegation, Vasco finished in 11th place, and qualified for the 2011 Copa Sudamericana. In the 2010 Copa do Brasil, the team reached the quarterfinals, being eliminated by Vitoria on away goals.

2011: The Redemption Year 

Vasco beat Coritiba on away goals in the 2011 Copa do Brasil finals, and lifted the trophy for the first time in the club's history. In the Série A, Vasco enjoyed an excellent campaign, finishing only 2 points behind Corinthians. A win on the last matchday would've given them the title, as Corinthians drew their match, but Flamengo held Vasco to a draw. The club also ended the year as semifinalists in the Copa Sudamericana, a competition that saw the club defeat Palmeiras, Aurora and Universitario in historic fashion before being eliminated by eventual champion Universidad de Chile on away goals. The season was dubbed as "Vasco's Redemption Year", with many lauding Vasco as one of Brazilian football's elite teams once again.

2012: Return to Copa Libertadores

Vasco's played their first final of 2012 in the Taca Guanabara, losing 1–3 to Fluminense after eliminating Flamengo in the semifinals. Two months later, they were playing a final again, this time losing to Botafogo in the Taca Rio, eliminating Flamengo in the semifinals again.

Vasco qualified for the 2012 Copa Libertadores as Brazilian Cup champion, marking a return to the top South American competition after 12 years. In the group stage, Vasco finished second tied with Libertad on points and only losing once. Vasco beat Lanús on penalties in the round of 16, to set a quarterfinal matchup with Corinthians, who eliminated Vasco 1–0 with an 88th-minute goal. In the Brazilian Championship, the team set the record for 54 consecutive rounds in the top 4 (continuing from the 2011 and 2012 seasons), although they ultimately finished in fifth and missed out on qualifying for the Libertadores the following year due to poor form, losing six of their last ten games.

2013–present: More relegations

2013: Second-ever Relegation 

After a good season in 2012, Vasco started their 2013 poorly and were hampered by financial issues. In the Taca Rio, the club had a terrible campaign and finished seventh of eight in the table. By the end of the year, the club had been relegated for the second time in 5 years and just the second time in their history, which was secured with a 5–1 defeat to Atletico Paranaense on the final matchday. In the Copa do Brasil the team entered in the round of 16, beating Nacional and then being eliminated by Goiás on away goals, despite winning the second leg 3–2.

After one season in the Série B during 2014, the team gained promotion, and in May 2015, won the Campeonato Carioca after a 12-year drought. However, they were relegated again in the 2015 edition, placing eighteenth, although they became back-to-back Carioca champions by winning the tournament in 2016 as well. Once again, they were promoted after one season in the B-level league, and in the 2020 season they were relegated for the fourth time and, for the first time, spent two consecutive seasons in the second division as they failed to be promoted during the 2021 season, placing tenth.

2022: 777 Partners 
On 22 February 2022 it was announced that 777 Partners, a Miami-based private investment firm founded by Steven W. Pasko and Josh Wander, bought a controlling stake in Vasco da Gama. According to the terms of the deal, 777 Partners acquired a 70% stake in the club which was valued at approximately $330 million.

On 6 November 2022, Vasco sealed their return to Série A, after a two-year absence.

Supporters
According to census and polls, Vasco da Gama is the second most supported football club in Rio de Janeiro state, and varies between the third and fifth most supported football club in Brazil.
Vasco fans are very diverse stretching across social class lines, however the core of most Vasco support lies within the working class of the Northern Zone of Rio de Janeiro and Rio outskirt cities like Niterói. Vasco da Gama have significant support in other regions in Brazil, notably the Northeastern and North regions as well as strongholds in southern Minas Gerais, Espirito Santo and in Santa Catarina. Vasco also have a huge support in Distrito Federal; a study conducted by TV Globo concluded that Vasco were the second-most supported team in the city, behind Flamengo.

Vasco da Gama have many celebrity supporters, including Pelé, Fátima Bernardes (journalist – TV Globo), Rodrigo Santoro (actor), Murilo Rosa (actor), Juliana Paes (actress),  Paulinho da Viola (singer), Roberto Carlos (singer), Erasmo Carlos (singer), Martinho da Vila (singer), Fernanda Abreu (singer), Viviane Araújo (model), Paulo Coelho (writer), Whindersson Nunes (comedian), Teresa Cristina (singer), Sergio Cabral Filho (Rio de Janeiro State former governor), Eduardo Paes (Rio de Janeiro mayor), Nelson Piquet (Formula 1 former champion), amongst others.

Vasco da Gama's torcidas organizadas have a strong friendship with torcidas organizadas of Atlético Mineiro, Palmeiras, Grêmio and Bahia. This alliance, having the 25 year friendship of torcidas Força Jovem Vasco, Mancha Verde do Palmeiras and Galoucura do Atlético Mineiro, utilize the code name D.P.A. – Dedos Para o Alto.
Torcida Força Jovem Vasco
Guerreiros do Almirante
Torcida Organizada do Vasco
Kamikazes Vascaínos
Pequenos Vascaínos
Renovascão Vasco Campeão
ResenVasco
VasBoaVista
União Vascaína
Ira Jovem Vasco
Torcida Expresso da Vitória

Other sports
Although best known as a football, rowing and swimming club, Vasco da Gama is actually a comprehensive sports club. Its basketball section, CR Vasco da Gama Basquete (three times Brazilian Champion and four times South-American Champion) produced former NBA player Nenê. The club is also the first Brazilian club to play against an NBA team, against San Antonio Spurs, in 1999, in the McDonald's Championship final. Its rowing team is one of the best of Brazil and of the continent, which swimmers regularly represent Brazil in international competitions. Vasco da Gama also has a four-times National Champion women's soccer team as well. Vasco's beach soccer team is one of the best in the world, being once World Champion, three times South-American Champion and many times National Champion. In addition to these, Vasco has many other sports with World, South American and Brazilian titles.

Players

First team squad

Youth academy

Out on loan

Management hierarchy and Technical Staff

Honours

Others 

 Copa Rio (2): 1992, 1993
 Taça Guanabara (12): 1976, 1977, 1986, 1987, 1990, 1992, 1994, 1998, 2000, 2003, 2016, 2019
 Taça Rio (11): 1984, 1988, 1992, 1993, 1998, 1999, 2001, 2003, 2004, 2017, 2021
 Torneio Municipal do Rio de Janeiro (4): 1944, 1945, 1946, 1947
 Other Rio de Janeiro state Championships (9): 1972, 1973, 1974, 1975, 1977, 1980, 1981, 1988, 1997
 Taça dos Campeões Rio de Janeiro – São Paulo: 1936
 Tournoi de Paris: 1957
 Teresa Herrera Trophy: 1957
 Trofeo Ciudad de Sevilla: 1979
 Festa d'Elx Trophy: 1979
 Colombino Trophy: 1980
 Ramón de Carranza Trophy (3): 1987, 1988, 1989
 Ciutat de Barcelona Trophy: 1993
 Trofeo Ciudad de Zaragoza: 1993
 City of Palma de Mallorca Trophy: 1995
 Torneio Inicio (10): 1926, 1929, 1930, 1931, 1932, 1942, 1944, 1945
 Torneio Relâmpago (2): 1944, 1946
..;Copa Ouro Los Angeles de Futebol de 1987
 Torneio Extra (2): 1973, 1990

Statistics
Explanation:

Former head coaches

 Ramón Platero (1922–1926)
 "Harry" Welfare (1927–1937)
 Floriano Peixoto Corrêa (1937–1938)
 Russinho (1938)
 Carlos Scarone (1938–1939)
 Ramón Platero (1939–1940)
 Gentil Cardoso (1940)
 "Harry" Welfare (1940–1942)
 Telêmaco Frazão de Lima (1942)
 "Harry" Welfare (1942–1943)
 Ondino Viera (1943–1946)
 Ernesto Santos (1946)
 Roque Calocero (1946–1947)
 Otto Glória (1947)
 Flávio Costa (1947–1951)
 Otto Glória (1951–1952)
 Gentil Cardoso (1952–1953)
 Flávio Costa (1953–56)
 Martim Francisco (1956–1957)
 Gradim (1957–1959)
 Yustrich (1959–60)
 Ely (1960)
 Filpo Núñez (1960)
 Ely (1960)
 Abel Picabea (1960–1961)
 Martim Francisco (1961)
 Ely (1961)
 Paulo Amaral (1961–62)
 Jorge Vieira (1962–1963)
 Otto Glória (1963)
 Eduardo Pelegrini (1963)
 Duque (1964)
 Ely (1964)
 Zezé Moreira (1965–1966)
 Ely (1966)
 Zizinho (1967)
 Gentil Cardoso (1967)
 Ademir (1967)
 Paulinho (1968)
 Pinga (1968–1969)
 Evaristo de Macedo (1969)
 Paulinho (1969)
 Célio de Souza (1969)
 Tim (1970)
 Paulo Amaral (1971)
 Admildo Chirol (1971)
 Zizinho (1972)
 Célio de Souza (1972)
 Mário Travaglini (1972–75)
 Paulo Emilio (1976)
 Orlando Fantoni (1977–78)
 Carlos Froner (1979)
 Gílson Nuñes (1979)
 Otto Glória (1979)
 Orlando Fantoni (1980)
 Gílson Nuñes (1980)
 Mário Zagallo (1980–81)
 Antônio Lopes (1981–83)
 Zanata (1983)
 Júlio César Leal (1983)
 Otto Glória (1983)
 Júlio César Leal (1983)
 Edu Coimbra (1984–1885)
 Antônio Lopes (1985–1886)
 Cláudio Garcia (1986)
 Joel Santana (1986–1887)
 Sebastião Lazaroni (1987–1888)
 Zanata (1988–1889)
 Orlando Lelé (1989)
 Sérgio Cosme (1989)
 Alcir Portela (1990)
 Nelsinho Rosa (1989)
 Alcir Portela (1990)
 Mário Zagallo (1990–1991)
 Antônio Lopes (1991)
 Nelsinho Rosa (1992)
 Joel Santana (1992–1993)
 Alcir Portela (1993)
 Jair Pereira (1994)
 Sebastião Lazaroni (1994)
 Nelsinho Rosa (1995)
 Abel Braga (1995)
 Alcir Portela (1995)
 Jair Pereira (1995)
 Zanata (1995–1996)
 Alcir Portela (1996)
 Carlos Alberto Silva (1996)
 Alcir Portela (1996)
 Antônio Lopes (1996–2000)
 Abel Braga (2000)
 Alcir Portela (interim) (2000)
 Tita (January 1, 2000 – June 30, 2000)
 Oswaldo de Oliveira (2000)
 Joel Santana (2000–01)
 Alcir Portela (2001)
 Hélio dos Anjos (2001)
 Paulo César Gusmão (2001)
 Evaristo de Macedo (2002)
 Antônio Lopes (2002–03)
 Mauro Galvão (2003)
 Geninho (December 15, 2003 – September 27, 2004)
 Joel Santana (September 27, 2004 – April 20, 2005)
 Dário Lourenço (2005)
 Renato Gaúcho (July 18, 2005 – April 12, 2007)
 Celso Roth (April 15, 2007 – October 22, 2007)
 Romário (interim) (October 22, 2007 – October 25, 2007)
 Valdir Espinosa (October 26, 2007 – December 31, 2007)
 Romário (January 1, 2008 – February 9, 2008)
 Alfredo Sampaio (2008)
 Antônio Lopes (March 31, 2008 – August 7, 2008)
 Tita (August 7, 2008 – September 17, 2008)
 Renato Gaúcho (September 18, 2008 – December 7, 2008)
 Dorival Júnior (December 12, 2008 – December 7, 2009)
 Vágner Mancini (December 12, 2009 – March 26, 2010)
 Gaúcho (interim) (March 30, 2010 – May 18, 2010)
 Celso Roth (May 18, 2010 – June 12, 2010)
 PC Gusmão (June 13, 2010 – January 28, 2011)
 Ricardo Gomes (February 2, 2011 – August 28, 2012)
 Cristóvão Borges (August 29, 2011 – September 10, 2012)
 Gaúcho (interim) (September 11, 2012 – September 13, 2012)
 Marcelo Oliveira (September 13, 2012 – November 5, 2012)
 Gaúcho (November 6, 2012 – March 21, 2013)
 Paulo Autuori (March 22, 2013 – July 9, 2013)
 Dorival Júnior (July 11, 2013 – October 28, 2013)
 Adílson Batista (2013–14)
 Joel Santana (2014)
 Doriva (Jan 2015 – July 2015)
 Celso Roth (July 2015 – Aug 2015)
 Jorginho (Aug 2015 – Nov 2016)
 Cristóvão Borges (Dec 2016 – March 2017)
 Milton Mendes (March 2017 – Aug 2017)
 Zé Ricardo (Aug 2017 – Jun 2018)
 Jorginho (Jun 2018 – Aug 2018)
 Alberto Valentim (Aug 2018 – April 2019)
 Vanderlei Luxemburgo (May 2019 – December 2019)
 Abel Braga (January 2020 – May 2020)
 Ramon Menezes (May 2020 – October 2020)
 Ricardo Sá Pinto (October 2020 – December 2020)
 Vanderlei Luxemburgo (December 2020 – February 2021 )
 Siston (interim) (2021)
 Cabo (2021) 
 A. Gomes (interim) (2021)
 Lisca (2021)
 Diniz (2021)
 Cortez (interim) (2021)
 Zé Ricardo (2022)
 Faro (interim) (2022)
 M. Souza (2022)

Top scorers

Updated November 2015

Stadium

Vasco da Gama's stadium is Estádio São Januário, inaugurated in 1927, with a maximum capacity of 35,000 people. The National Championship games have a maximum capacity of 21,880 people, for security reasons.

Rivals
Vasco's biggest rivals are from the same city: Fluminense, Botafogo and Flamengo, with the latter being its biggest rival. The games between Vasco and Flamengo ("Millions Derby") are the most watched in Brazil. The matches are usually played in the Maracanã, and reunite two of the biggest crowds of Rio de Janeiro.

Kit evolution

Vasco da Gama is one of the oldest Brazilian clubs and has had several different kits in its history. Vasco da Gama's first kit, used in rowing, was created in 1898, and was completely black, with a left diagonal sash.

Vasco da Gama's first football kit, created in 1916, was completely black, and was easily identified because of the presence of a white tie and a belt. In 1929, the club's kit was changed. The tie and the belt were removed. However, the kit remained all-black. In the 1930s, the home kit's color was changed again. The kit became black with a white right diagonal sash.

In 1945, the kit's color was changed to white, and a black diagonal sash was introduced. The sash was introduced because the club's manager at the time, the Uruguayan Ondino Viera liked the sash used in his previous club's kit, River Plate of Argentina, and adopted this pattern in Vasco's away kit. So, both kits had a right-to-left diagonal sash.

In 1988, the sash located on the back of the shirt was removed.

In 1998, the kit design was changed again. This kit became very similar to the 1945 one. However, a thin red line outlined the sash.

Vasco currently has three kits. The home shirt's main color is black with a white sash. The short and the socks are black. The away kit is similar to the home kit, but the main color is white, the sash is black, and the shorts and socks are white. In 2009–10 the third kit was all white, with a red "cross of the Knights Templar". In 2010, the away kit changed to black in honor of 1923's team, which gave up playing for having black players, which were not allowed to play with white players at that time.

From July 2009, after breaking the partnership with Champs, to 2013, the official jerseys were produced by Penalty. Since 2020, the kits are made by Kappa (brand).

Logo and flag
The eight stars on the badge and flag signify: 1- South American Championship of Champions: 1948; 2- Copa Libertadores: 1998; 3- Copa Mercosur: 2000; 4- Campeonato Brasileiro Série A: 1974; 5- 1989; 6- 1997; 7- 2000; 8- The Unbeaten Championship of Earth-and-sea of 1945.

Anthems
Vasco's official anthem was composed in 1918, by Joaquim Barros Ferreira da Silva, it was the club's first anthem. There is another official anthem, created in the 1930s, called "Meu Pavilhão" (meaning My Pavilion), whose lyrics were composed by João de Freitas and music by Hernani Correia. This anthem replaced the previous one. The club's most popular anthem, however, is an unofficial anthem composed by Lamartine Babo in 1942.

Clubs named after Vasco
Due to Vasco's tradition, several clubs are named after it, including Associação Desportiva Vasco da Gama, of Acre state, founded in 1952, Vasco Esporte Clube, of Sergipe state, founded in 1931, Esporte Clube Vasco da Gama, of Americana, São Paulo state, founded in 1958, Vasco Sports Club, which is an Indian football club founded in 1951, and CR Vasco da Gama Football Club, which is a South African football club founded in 1980. Tomazinho Futebol Clube, from São João de Meriti, Rio de Janeiro state, founded in 1930, has a logo strongly inspired by Vasco's logo, and share the same colors.

References
Enciclopédia do Futebol Brasileiro, Volume 1 – Lance, Rio de Janeiro: Aretê Editorial S/A, 2001.

External links

Official Site
Torcida Força Jovem Vasco
Unofficial Home Page
Vasco da Gama Unofficial Home Page

 
All articles with unsourced statements
Articles with unsourced statements from September 2012
1898 establishments in Brazil
Association football clubs established in 1898
Football clubs in Rio de Janeiro (state)
Football clubs in Rio de Janeiro (city)
Multi-sport clubs in Brazil
Portuguese-Brazilian culture
Diaspora football clubs in Brazil
V
V
Copa do Brasil winning clubs
Campeonato Brasileiro Série A winning clubs
2022 mergers and acquisitions